The following is a list of motor racing venues, ordered by capacity; i.e. the maximum number of spectators they can accommodate. Due to the length of motor racing courses, and the fact that the cars pass each point frequently, it is often not possible to see the entire track from any one seat. This makes it possible to seat larger numbers of people, and differentiates a race-track from other stadiums, in which the entire field of play usually is visible from every seat. Some race-tracks also contain sitting or standing areas in the form of grassy banks. Currently all venues with a standard capacity of 35,000 or more are included.

Italics indicate that the circuit formerly hosted a certain championship round.

Defunct venues

See also
List of motor racing tracks
List of stadiums by capacity
List of horse racing venues by capacity
List of sports venues by capacity

Notes

References